Gardendale First Baptist Church (sometimes styled as "Gardendale's" or GFBC) is a Baptist megachurch in Gardendale, Alabama. It is affiliated with the Southern Baptist Convention. The senior pastor is Dr. Kevin Hamm.

History
The church was founded in 1876. In 1992, Steve Gaines became senior pastor, before leaving in 2006. In 2006, Kevin Hamm became senior pastor. The church claims weekly attendance of about 3,500 worshipers.

References

External links
Gardendale First Baptist official web site

Baptist churches in Alabama
Evangelical megachurches in the United States
Southern Baptist Convention churches
Megachurches in Alabama